Prince Ranieri Maria Gaetano, Duke of Castro (3 December 1883 – 13 January 1973) was a claimant to the headship of the House of Bourbon-Two Sicilies.

Biography
He was born in Cannes, France, the ninth child but fifth son of Prince Alfonso, Count of Caserta and Princess Maria Antonietta of Bourbon-Two Sicilies (1851–1938). Ranieri for a time served in the Royal Spanish Army.

Following the death of his brother Prince Ferdinand Pius, Duke of Calabria on 7 January 1960 Prince Ranieri was declared Head of the House of Bourbon-Two Sicilies by all relatives except for Infante Alfonso, Duke of Calabria and his children, because the Infante's senior branch of the family abdicated their claims in order to be in line for the Spanish throne. He remained head of the house until his death on 13 January 1973 in Lacombe. He handed over the functions associated with the headship of the house to his son in 1966.

Marriage and children
Ranieri married his first cousin Countess Maria Carolina Zamoyska (1896–1968) on 12 September 1923 in Vyšné Ružbachy, Slovakia, from the marriage he had two children:

Princess Maria del Carmen Carolina Antonia of Bourbon-Two Sicilies (1924–2018).
Prince Ferdinando Maria Andrea Alfonso Marcus, Duke of Castro (1926–2008).

Honours
Grand Master of the Sacred Military Constantinian Order of Saint George
Grand Master of the Order of Saint Januarius
Grand Master of the Order of Saint Ferdinand and of Merit
Grand Master of the Royal Order of Francis I
Grand Master of the Order of Saint George and Reunion
Knight of the Spanish Order of the Golden Fleece
Knight of the Order of Saint Hubert of Bavaria
Knight of the Supreme Order of the Most Holy Annunciation
Bailiff Grand Cross of Honor and Devotion of the Sovereign Military Order of Malta
Knight Grand Cross of the Order of Charles III
Knight of the Order of Alcántara

Arms

Ancestry

References

External links
Royal House of Bourbon-Two Sicilies

1883 births
1973 deaths
People from Cannes
Princes of Bourbon-Two Sicilies
Pretenders to the throne of the Kingdom of the Two Sicilies
Dukes of Castro
Knights of the Golden Fleece of Spain
Bailiffs Grand Cross of Honour and Devotion of the Sovereign Military Order of Malta
Knights of the Order of Alcántara
Burials at the Cimetière du Grand Jas
French Roman Catholics